Viwawa is a portal for casual browser-based multiplayer online games and creation of avatars called Wawas developed by Pendulab Private Limited. The company is based in Singapore.

List of games 
All games developed by Viwawa are multi-player and casual in nature.

Stwack - an original stickman fighting game
Big 2.5 - a card shedding game popular in Asia, also known as Big 2
MatchIt - a memory card game
Checkmate - International Chess in 2D and 3D
Wahjong - Mahjong with Singapore rules and Hong Kong rules
Sushido - a match 3 game where chefs compete to serve sushi to their customers. They must match three identical ingredients horizontally/vertically.
Zany Bridge - a card game based on contract bridge with rules abiding to Singapore Bridge
Wahlords - a strategy game where players attempt to bomb each other
Numeroid - a game similar to Puzzle Bobble with a requirement to construct mathematical equations
Dynasty Chess - Chinese Chess game with animated chess pieces
Groword - a game of forming words from a 5x5 board of alphabets
Harvest Time - a card shedding game popular in China, also known as Dou dizhu
Speedoku - a Sudoku game based on speed
DEFCON 1 - a Tower Defence game
Buffet Wars - a projectile game with a food theme
Tien Len - a local card game for Vietnamese
Texas Holdem

Features 
Viwawa extend their games to iPhones for Big 2.5 and a minigame for Sushido called Sushido Harvest.
In October 2010, Viwawa launched DevPals for game developers to create new games for the Viwawa Community.
In November 2010, Viwawa launched Viwawa Superfriends for better gaming in Viwawa.
In 2011 February, Viwawa added Charisma to all profiles linkage to Facebook and Twitter.

Business model 
Viwawa games are essentially free to play. Revenue is derived through its games and avatar creation via micro-transactions over micropayment services such as PayPal, SMS mobile payments, Cherry Credits, MOLePoints and scratch cards.

History 
Viwawa was launched in December 2007.

In 2008, Viwawa entered a partnership with Disney to create Disney content in their Avatar customization engine. At the same time, Viwawa also partnered with Garena to provide casual games to all Garena gamers.

In July 2009, World Cyber Games (Singapore) hosted the competition finals for Viwawa games.

In November 2009, Sanook! partnered with Viwawa to bring the games to their users in Thailand.

In 2010, Viwawa games Stwack and Sushido were featured in SG Gamebox, an initiative by the Media Development Authority of Singapore

From 2020 onwards, Viwawa is no longer accessible.

References

External links 
 Official Viwawa website

Video game development companies
Browser-based game websites
Social networking services
Casual games
Video game companies of Singapore